The following elections occurred in the year 2003.

Africa
 2003 Beninese parliamentary election
 2003 Djiboutian parliamentary election
 2003 Guinean presidential election
 2003 Mauritanian presidential election
 2003 Nigerian parliamentary election
 2003 Nigerian presidential election
 2003 Rwandan presidential election
 2003 Rwandan parliamentary election
 2003 Somaliland presidential election
 2003 Swazi parliamentary election
 2003 Togolese presidential election

Asia
 2003 Azerbaijani presidential election
 2003 Cambodian parliamentary election
 2003 Israeli legislative election
 2003 Jordanian parliamentary election
 2003 Kuwaiti parliamentary election
 2003 Maldivian presidential election
 2003 North Korean parliamentary election
 2003 Omani parliamentary election
 2003 Syrian parliamentary election
 2003 Yemeni parliamentary election
 State Assembly elections in India, 2003

Japan
 2003 Japanese general election
 Results of the 2003 Japanese general election
 2003 Shibuya mayoral election
 2003 Tokyo gubernatorial election

Europe
 2003 Åland legislative election
 2003 Armenian presidential election
 2003 Armenian parliamentary election
 2003 Belgian general election
 2003 Corsican autonomy referendum
 2003 Croatian parliamentary election
 2003 Cypriot presidential election
 2003 Czech European Union membership referendum
 2003 Estonian parliamentary election
 2003 Finnish parliamentary election
 2003 Georgian constitutional referendum
 2003 Georgian legislative election
 2003 Gibraltar general election
 2003 Icelandic parliamentary election
 2002–2003 Lithuanian presidential election
 2003 Maltese European Union membership referendum
 2003 Maltese general election
 2003 Monegasque parliamentary election
 February 2003 Montenegrin presidential election
 May 2003 Montenegrin presidential election
 2003 Northern Cyprus parliamentary election
 2003 Norwegian county council election
 2003 Norwegian local elections
 2003 Serbian parliamentary election
 2003 Moldovan local elections
 2003 Transnistrian referendum
 2003 Dutch general election
 2003 Russian legislative election
 2003 Sammarinese local elections
 2003 Swedish euro referendum

Austria
 2003 Lower Austrian state election
 2003 Upper Austrian state election

Germany
 2003 Bavaria state election
 2003 Bremen state election
 2003 Hesse state election
 2003 Lower Saxony state election

Italy
 2003 Friuli-Venezia Giulia regional election
 2003 Trentino-Alto Adige/Südtirol provincial elections
 2003 Valdostan regional election

Spain
 2003 Catalan parliamentary election
 Elections to the Corts Valencianes, 2003
 Elections to the Aragonese Corts, 2003

Switzerland
 2003 Swiss Federal Council election
 2003 Swiss federal election

United Kingdom
 2003 Brent East by-election
 2003 Conservative Party leadership election
 United Kingdom elections, 2003
 2003 Liberal Democrats deputy leadership election
 2003 United Kingdom local elections
 2003 National Assembly for Wales election
 2003 Northern Ireland Assembly election
 2003 Scottish Parliament election

United Kingdom local
 2003 United Kingdom local elections

English local
 2003 Adur Council election
 2003 Allerdale Council election
 2003 Alnwick Council election
 2003 Amber Valley Council election
 2003 Arun Council election
 2003 Ashfield Council election
 2003 Ashford Council election
 2003 Aylesbury Vale Council election
 2003 Babergh Council election
 2003 Barrow-in-Furness Council election
 2003 Bassetlaw Council election
 2003 Blackpool Council election
 2003 Bolton Council election
 2003 Brentwood Council election
 2003 Broxbourne Council election
 2003 Burnley Council election
 2003 Calderdale Council election
 2003 Cherwell Council election
 2003 Chichester Council election
 2003 Chorley Council election
 2003 Corby Borough Council election
 2003 Craven Council election
 2003 Dacorum Council election
 2003 Daventry Council election
 2003 Derby Council election
 2003 Eastleigh Council election
 2003 Ellesmere Port and Neston Council election
 2003 Epping Forest Council election
 2003 Fylde Council election
 2003 Gateshead Council election
 2003 Harlow Council election
 2003 Hart Council election
 2003 Hinckley and Bosworth Council election
 2003 Hull Council election
 2003 Hyndburn Council election
 2003 Ipswich Borough Council election
 2003 Kettering Borough Council election
 2003 Knowsley Council election
 2003 Leeds Council election
 2003 Lincoln Council election
 2003 Liverpool Council election
 2003 Mole Valley Council election
 2003 Newcastle-under-Lyme Council election
 2003 North Lincolnshire Council election
 2003 North Tyneside Council election
 2003 Northampton Council election
 2003 Penwith Council election
 2003 Portsmouth Council election
 2003 Preston Council election
 2003 Purbeck Council election
 2003 Redditch Council election
 2003 Restormel Council election
 2003 Rochdale Council election
 2003 Rochford Council election
 2003 Rossendale Council election
 2003 Rugby Council election
 2003 Runnymede Council election
 2003 Rushmoor Council election
 2003 Ryedale Council election
 2003 Salford Council election
 2003 Scarborough Council election
 2003 Sedgefield Council election
 2003 Sedgemoor Council election
 2003 Sefton Council election
 2003 Sheffield Council election
 2003 Solihull Council election
 2003 South Gloucestershire Council election
 2003 South Lakeland Council election
 2003 South Oxfordshire Council election
 2003 South Ribble Council election
 2003 South Tyneside Council election
 2003 Southend-on-Sea Council election
 2003 St Albans Council election
 2003 St Helens Council election
 2003 Stafford Borough Council election
 2003 Stevenage Council election
 2003 Stratford-on-Avon Council election
 2003 Swindon Council election
 2003 Tamworth Council election
 2003 Tandridge Council election
 2003 Three Rivers Council election
 2003 Trafford Council election
 2003 Tunbridge Wells Council election
 2003 Tynedale Council election
 2003 Vale of White Horse Council election
 2003 Wakefield Council election
 2003 Watford Council election
 2003 Waveney Council election
 2003 Welwyn Hatfield Council election
 2003 West Lancashire Council election
 2003 West Lindsey Council election
 2003 West Wiltshire Council election
 2003 Weymouth and Portland Council election
 2003 Wigan Council election
 2003 Winchester Council election
 2003 Windsor and Maidenhead Council election
 2003 Wirral Council election
 2003 Woking Council election
 2003 Wokingham Council election
 2003 Wolverhampton Council election
 2003 Worcester Council election
 2003 Worthing Council election
 2003 Wyre Forest Council election
 2003 York Council election

Scottish local
 2003 Glasgow City Council election
 2003 North Lanarkshire Council election
 2003 South Lanarkshire Council election
 2003 Highland Council election

North America
 2003 Belizean municipal elections
 2003 Belizean legislative election
 2003 Guatemalan general election
 2003 Salvadoran legislative election

Canada
 Brigham municipal election
 2003 Liberal Party of Canada leadership election
 2003 Manitoba general election
 2003 New Brunswick general election
 2003 New Democratic Party leadership election
 New Democratic Party of Prince Edward Island candidates in the 2003 Prince Edward Island provincial election
 2003 Newfoundland and Labrador general election
 2003 Northwest Territories general election
 2003 Nova Scotia general election
 2003 Ontario general election
 2003 Prince Edward Island Liberal Party leadership election
 2003 Prince Edward Island general election
 2003 Progressive Conservative leadership convention
 2003 Quebec general election
 2003 Quebec municipal elections
 2003 Saskatchewan general election

Ontario municipal
 2003 Ontario municipal elections
 2003 Brantford municipal election
 2003 Greater Sudbury municipal election
 2003 Guelph municipal election
 2003 Hamilton, Ontario municipal election
 2003 Norfolk County municipal election
 2003 Oakville municipal election
 2003 Ottawa municipal election
 2003 Peterborough municipal election
 2003 St. Catharines municipal election
 2003 Toronto municipal election
 2003 Vaughan municipal election

Caribbean
 2003 Barbadian general election
 2003 Bermudian general election
 2003 British Virgin Islands general election
 2003 Cuban parliamentary election
 2003 Grenadian general election
 2003 Trinidadian local elections
 2003 Turks and Caicos Islands general election

Mexico
 2003 Mexican elections
 2003 Colima state election
 2003 Mexican legislative election
 2003 Nuevo León state election

United States
 2003 United States elections

United States gubernatorial
 2003 United States gubernatorial elections
 2003 California gubernatorial recall election
 2003 Louisiana gubernatorial election
 2003 Kentucky gubernatorial election
 2003 Mississippi general election
 2003 Mississippi gubernatorial election
 2003 Pennsylvania state elections

United States mayoral
 2003 Charlotte mayoral election
 2003 Houston mayoral election
 2003 Jacksonville mayoral election
 2003 Philadelphia mayoral election
 2003 Raleigh mayoral election
 2003 San Francisco mayoral election

Oceania
 2003 Arutanga by-election
 2003 Kiribati parliamentary election
 July 2003 Kiribati presidential election
 2003 Marshall Islands general election
 2003 Rua'au by-election

Australia
 2003 Maryborough state by-election
 2003 New South Wales state election

South America
 2003 Argentine general election
 2003 Paraguayan general election

See also

 
2003
Elections